James David Sharman (born 12 March 1945) is an Australian director and writer for film and stage with more than 70 productions to his credit. He is renowned in Australia for his work as a theatre director from the 1960s to the present, and is best known internationally as the director of the 1973 theatrical hit The Rocky Horror Show, its film adaptation The Rocky Horror Picture Show (1975) and the film's follow-up, Shock Treatment (1981).

Life and career
Sharman was born in Sydney, the son of boxing tent impresario and rugby league player James Michael "Jimmy" Sharman jr. (1912–2006) and Christina McAndleish Sharman ( Mirchell; 1914–2003). He was educated in Sydney, though his upbringing included time spent on Australian showgrounds, where his father ran a travelling sideshow of popular legend, founded by his own father, called "Jimmy Sharman's Boxing Troupe". This brought him into contact with the world of circus and travelling vaudeville. Developing an interest in theatre, he graduated from the production course at the National Institute of Dramatic Art (NIDA) in Sydney in 1966.

Sharman created a series of productions of experimental theatre, many for the Old Tote Theatre Company, culminating in a controversial staging of Mozart's Don Giovanni for Opera Australia when he was 21 years old. Over the following decade, he directed three rock musicals: Hair in 1969 (Sydney, Melbourne, Tokyo, Boston) (he also designed the original Sydney production); Jesus Christ Superstar in 1972 (Australia and Palace Theatre, London) and created the original production of The Rocky Horror Show with Richard O'Brien in 1973 (Royal Court Theatre, London – subsequently in Sydney, Los Angeles, Melbourne, New York City). 

He co-wrote the screenplay and directed the international cult hit film The Rocky Horror Picture Show (1975) for Twentieth Century Fox and directed its loosely based sequel, Shock Treatment, in 1981. In 1985, he directed third year students at (NIDA) in a production of A Dream Play.

In the following decades, Sharman directed a series of new works and Australian premieres, including a series of productions of plays by Patrick White in the late 1970s – The Season at Sarsaparilla, Big Toys, Netherwood and A Cheery Soul – which are credited with reviving the Nobel Laureate's career as a dramatist. 

He also directed the film The Night the Prowler, from a screenplay adapted by White from one of his short stories, and notable as White's only produced film screenplay. One of Sharman's most frequent creative collaborators was production designer Brian Thomson, a partnership that began at the Old Tote and continued through their ground-breaking and widely praised stage productions, the rock musicals Hair, Jesus Christ Superstar and The Rocky Horror Show, and the films Shirley Thompson vs. the Aliens, The Rocky Horror Picture Show and Shock Treatment.

Sharman was artistic director of the Adelaide Festival of Arts in 1982 and, while in South Australia, he created Lighthouse, a theatre company which specialised in radical stagings of classics and premieres of new work by major Australian dramatists, including Louis Nowra, Stephen Sewell and Patrick White. The ensemble included many major Australian artists, including actors Geoffrey Rush, Gillian Jones, John Wood and Kerry Walker and associate director Neil Armfield, who would further develop this adventurous tradition at Sydney's Belvoir Street Theatre.

Continuing as a freelance director, Sharman directed Stephen Sewell's Three Furies – scenes from the life of Francis Bacon, for which he won a Helpmann Award for Best Direction of a Play. It played at the 2005 Sydney and Auckland festivals and the 2006 Perth and Adelaide festivals. In 2006, he revived his landmark staging of Benjamin Britten's Death in Venice for Opera Australia. In 2009, he directed a new production of Mozart's Così fan tutte for Opera Australia, a collaboration with the Berlin-based Australian conductor Simon Hewett.

In August 2008, Sharman's memoirs Blood and Tinsel were published by Melbourne University Publishing in which he talks about his childhood on the road with Jimmy Sharman's Boxing Troupe and also speaks out for the first time about The Rocky Horror Picture Show and his many productions.

Sharman is a resident of Egerton Crescent, Kensington, London.

Select credits

Theatre
Still Life (1964) – The Old Tote Theatre, Kensington, NSW
The Sport of My Mad Mother (1964) The Old Tote Theatre, Kensington, NSW
Inadmissable Evidence (1964) – The Old Tote Theatre, Kensington, NSW
Entertaining Mr Sloane (1965) – The Old Tote Theatre, Kensington, NSW
The Lover (1966) – AMP Theatrette, Circular Quay, NSW
The Gents (1966) – AMP Theatrette, Circular Quay, NSW
Operatic Concerto (1966) – New South Wales
Chips With Everything (1966) – Independent Theatre, North Sydney, NSW
A Taste of Honey (1967)
And So To Bed, Playhouse Theatre (1967) – Perth, WA
Don Giovanni (1967) – national tour
The Flower Children, A Little Bourke Street Discotheque (1967) – Melbourne
The Birthday Party (1967) – St Martins Theatre, South Yarra, VIC
You Never Can Tell (1968) – The Old Tote Theatre
Terror Australis (1968) – Jane Street Theatre
Norm and Ahmed by Alex Buzo (1968) – Old Tote Theatre
Hair (1969) – Metro Theatre, Sydney – later national tour (1971–73) and productions in New Zealand (1972), Tokyo, Boston
As You Like It (1971) – Parade Theatre, Kensington
King Lear (1971) – Russell St Theatre, Melbourne
Lasseter (1971) – Parade Theatre, Kensington 1971
Jesus Christ Superstar (1972–73) – national tour of Australia= – also did productions in London (1972)
The Unseen Hand by Sam Shepherd – London
The Removalists (1973) – Royal Court Theatre, London
The Threepenny Opera (1973) – Drama Theatre, Sydney
The Rocky Horror Show (1973) – London – also directed productions in Los Angeles and Sydney (1974), Melbourne (1975)
The Season at Sarsaparilla by Patrick White (1975) – Drama Theatre, Sydney
Big Toys by Patrick White (1977) – Parade Theatre, Kensington
Pandora's Cross (1978) – Paris Theatre, Sydney
A Cheery Soul by Patrick White (1979)
Death in Venice (1980) – Festival Theatre, Adelaide
Lulu (1981) – Sydney & Adelaide
A Midsummer Night's Dream (1982) – The Playhouse, Adelaide, SA
Silver Lining (1982) – The Lighthouse, Adelaide, SA
Royal Show (1982) – The Playhouse, Adelaide, SA,
Blood Wedding (1983) – The Lighthouse, Adelaide, SA
Netherwood (1983) – The Playhouse, Adelaide, SA
Pal Joey (1983) – The Lighthouse, Adelaide, SA
Sunrise (1983) – The Playhouse, Adelaide, SA
Dreamplay (1985) – Parade Theatre, Kensington, NSW
Voss (1986–87) – national tour
Blood Relations – Drama Theatre, Sydney, NSW
A Lie of the Mind (1987) – Belvoir Street Theatre, Surry Hills, NSW
Blood Relations (1987) – The Playhouse, Adelaide, SA
The Screens (1988) – NIDA Theatre, Kensington, NSW
The Rake's Progress (1988) – Opera Theatre, Sydney, NSW
The Conquest of the South Pole (1989) – Belvoir Street Theatre, Surry Hills, NSW
Death in Venice (1989) – Opera Theatre, Sydney, NSW
Chess (1990) – Theatre Royal, Sydney, NSW
Voss (1990) – Opera Theatre, Sydney
Death in Venice (1991) – State Theatre, Melbourne
Shadow and Splendour (1992) – national tour
The Wedding Song (1994) – Parade Theatre, Kensington, NSW
Miss Julie (1995) – The Playhouse, Adelaide
The Tempest (1997) – national tour through Australia
Berlin to Broadway with Kurt Weill (2000) -NIDA Studio, Kensington, NSW
Language of the Gods (2001) – NIDA Theatre, Sydney
What the Butler Saw (2004) – Belvoir St Sydney
Death in Venice (2005) – Opera Theatre Sydney
Three Furies: Scenes from the Life of Francis Bacon (2006) – Playhouse Theatre Perth
Mozart's Così fan tutte - Opera House Theatre, Sydney (2009)

Films
Arcade (1970) – 5-minute short
Roll up (1971) – unfinished documentary
Shirley Thompson vs. the Aliens (1972)
The Rocky Horror Picture Show (1975)
Summer of Secrets (1976)
The Night the Prowler (1978)
Shock Treatment (1981)

Awards and nominations

Helpmann Awards
The Helpmann Awards is an awards show, celebrating live entertainment and performing arts in Australia, presented by industry group Live Performance Australia (LPA) since 2001. In 2018, Sharman received the JC Williamson Award, the LPA's highest honour, for their life's work in live performance.

|-
| 2005 || Three Furies || Best Direction of a Play || 
|-
| 2018 || Himself || JC Williamson Award || 
|-

References

External links
 
 

1945 births
Australian film directors
Australian theatre directors
Helpmann Award winners
Living people
Writers from Sydney
Horror film directors